Tritonoturris capensis is a species of sea snail, a marine gastropod mollusk in the family Raphitomidae.

Description
The length of the shell attains 13 mm, its diameter 5 mm.

Distribution
This marine species occurs off Port Elizabeth and False Bay, South Africa and off Mozambique.

References

 Steyn, D.G. & Lussi, M. (1998) Marine Shells of South Africa. An Illustrated Collector's Guide to Beached Shells. Ekogilde Publishers, Hartebeespoort, South Africa, ii + 264 pp.

External links
 Thiele J., 1925. Gastropoden der Deutschen Tiefsee-Expedition. In:. Wissenschaftliche Ergebnisse der Deutschen Tiefsee-Expedition auf dem Dampfer "Valdivia" 1898–1899 II. Teil, vol. 17, No. 2, Gustav Fischer, Berlin
  Powell A.W.B.(1966) The molluscan families Speightiidae and Turridae: an evaluation of the valid taxa, both recent and fossil, with lists of characteristic species; Bulletin of the Auckland Institute and Museum ; no. 5
 
 Smith E.A. (1882). Diagnoses of new species of Pleurotomidae in the British Museum. Annals and Magazine of Natural History. ser. 5, 10: 296-306
 Biolib.cz: image

capensis
Gastropods described in 1882